"Juste une photo de toi" (English: Just a picture of you) is a song performed by French singer M. Pokora.  Produced by Gee Futuristic & X-Plosive, the song serves as the lead single from Pokora's fourth studio album Mise à Jour. It was released on June 7, 2010.

Music video
A music video was shot in Montreal, Quebec, Canada showing relationship with his love interest, with other shots showing him dancing with a number of dancers.

Charts

Release history

Notes

2010 singles
M. Pokora songs
Songs written by M. Pokora
2010 songs
EMI Records singles